HD 29559 is a solitary star  in the southern constellation Caelum. It has an apparent magnitude of 6.40, placing it near the max naked eye visibility.

HD 29559 has a stellar classification of A5 IV-V — a luminosity class intermediate between a  main sequence star and subgiant. It has alternatively been classified as A3 Vs:,  indicating that it is an A-type main-sequence star with sharp (narrow) absorption lines due to slow rotation. However, there is uncertainty behind the class.

It is estimated to be 719 million years old, having completed 85.9% of its main sequence lifetime.

References

29559
CD-42 01572
21525
A-type main-sequence stars
Caelum
Caeli, 8
A-type subgiants
High-proper-motion stars